Harald Burger (born 1940 in Duisburg) is a Swiss-German linguist. He received his Ph.D. in 1964 at the University of Zurich. (His dissertation Belisarius: Edition und Versuch einer Deutung is a study about the baroque author Jacob Bidermann). In 1975 Burger was appointed full professor of Germanic philology.

In 1990 Harald Burger was naturalized in Switzerland. In 2006 he became professor emeritus.

Works
 Mediensprache. Eine Einführung in Sprache und Kommunikationsformen der Massenmedien. 3rd edition. De Gruyter, Berlin/New York 2005,
 Phraseologie. Eine Einführung am Beispiel des Deutschen. 4th edition. Erich Schmidt, Berlin 2010, .

External links
 Homepage @ University of Zurich

Linguists from Switzerland
Academic staff of the University of Zurich
Linguists of Germanic languages
1940 births
Living people